Hoplichthys prosemion is a species of marine ray-finned fish of the family Hoplichthyidae, the ghost flatheads.

References

Hoplichthyidae
Fish described in 1938
Taxa named by Henry Weed Fowler